EVT-101, also known as ENS-101, is an experimental medication which originated from Roche and is under development by Evotec AG for the treatment of major depressive disorder. It acts as a selective NMDA receptor subunit 2B (NR2B) antagonist. The drug was first claimed by Roche in 2002.  By 2017, EVT-101 was in phase II clinical trials for major depressive disorder; however, development of the drug was discontinued in 2021.

See also
 List of investigational antidepressants

References

Antidepressants
Abandoned drugs
Imidazoles
NMDA receptor antagonists
Organofluorides
Pyridazines